During the 2007–08 German football season, Karlsruher SC competed in the Bundesliga.

Season summary
Karlsruher SC secured safety with a comfortable 11th place in the season following promotion.

First-team squad
Squad at end of season

Left club during season

References

Notes

Karlsruher SC
Karlsruher SC seasons